The Berchtesgaden Alps are a mountain range of the Northern Limestone Alps, named after the market town of Berchtesgaden located in the centre. The central part belongs to the Berchtesgadener Land district of southeastern Bavaria, Germany, while the adjacent area in the north, east and south is part of the Austrian state of Salzburg (Salzburger Land).

Geography

Mountains and lakes 

The range also comprises the Obersalzberg slope east of Berchtesgaden, known for the former Berghof residence of Adolf Hitler. The picturesque heart is formed by the glacial Königssee lake with the famous St. Bartholomew's pilgrimage church and the smaller Obersee, both part of the Berchtesgaden National Park established in 1978. The range also comprises glaciers like the Blaueis as well as the Steinernes Meer high karst plateau.

Peaks 

The most important summits of the Berchtesgaden Alps are (groups in order of height):
 Hochkönig massif: Hochkönig (2,941 m), Hochseiler (2,793 m), Torsäule (2,587 m), Mandlwand
 Watzmann massif: Watzmann-Mittel- (2,713 m) and -Südspitze (2,712 m),  Kleiner Watzmann (Watzmannfrau) (2,307 m),  Watzmannkinder (up to 2,270 m)
 Steinernes Meer: Selbhorn (2,655 m), Schönfeldspitze (2,653 m), Brandhorn (2,609 m), Großer Hundstod (2,594 m), Funtenseetauern (2,579 m), Wildalmkirchl (2,578 m), Schareck (2,570 m), Breithorn (2,504 m), Persailhorn (2,347 m)
 Hochkalter Mountains: Hochkalter (2,607 m), Hocheisspitze (2,521 m), Seehorn (2,321 m)
 Göllstock: Hoher Göll (2,522 m), Hohes Brett (2,340 m), Jenner (1,874 m), Ahornbüchsenkopf (1,604 m)
 Hagen Mountains: Großes Teufelshorn (2,363 m), Kahlersberg (2,350 m), Schneibstein (2,276 m), Feuerpalven (1,741 m)
 Reiter Alpe: Stadelhorn (2,286 m), Großes Häuselhorn (2,284 m), Wagendrischelhorn (2,251 m), Großes Mühlsturzhorn (2,235 m), Großes Grundübelhorn (2,098 m), Schottmalhorn (2,045 m)
 Untersberg: Berchtesgaden Hochthron (1,973 m), Salzburg Hochthron (1,853 m)
 Lattengebirge: Karkopf (1,738 m), Dreisesselberg (1,680 m), Predigtstuhl (1,618 m), Spechtenköpfe (1,285 m)

Boundaries and neighbouring groups 

The Berchtesgaden Alps border on the following other mountain groups of the Alps:
 Salzkammergut Mountains to the east (Osterhorn Group), separated  by the Salzburg Basin (city of Salzburg, Hallein)
 Tennen Mountains to the southeast, on the far side of the Salzach gap by the Lueg Pass 
 Salzburg Slate Alps to the south, bounded by the line from Bischofshofen - Mühlbachtal (village of Mühlbach) – Dienten Saddle – Dienten – Filzen Saddle –Urslau via Maria Alm to Saalfelden 
 Kitzbühel Alps for a small section in the southwest near Saalfelden
 Lofer and Leogang Mountains to the west, from the Salzburg Saalach valley as far as Lofer
 Chiemgau Alps to the northwest from Unken (Salzburg) via the Bavarian Schneizlreuth to Bad Reichenhall

The Berchtesgaden Alps are included under this name in the generally accepted Alpine Club classification of the Eastern Alps (AVE) as mountain group no. 10 and counted as part of the Northern Limestone Alps.

Literature 
 Heinrich Bauregger: Berchtesgadener Land, Rother Wanderführer, Bergverlag Rother, Munich, 
 Bernhard Kühnhauser: Berchtesgadener Alpen, Rother Alpenvereinsführer alpin, Bergverlag Rother, Munich,   appeared in October 8

References

External links 

 Tours and summits in the Berchtesgaden Alps at steinmandl.de
 Berchtesgaden National Park
 Municipality of Berchtesgaden
 Berchtesgadener Land
 Berchtesgaden Alps
 Photo gallery
 Alpine climbing in the Berchtesgaden Alps
 Mountain tour in the Berchtesgaden Alps

 
Mountain ranges of the Alps
Northern Limestone Alps
Mountain ranges of Salzburg (state)
Mountain ranges of Bavaria
Biosphere reserves of Germany
Protected areas of Bavaria